Beckenham Junction is the main railway and tram station in Beckenham in the London Borough of Bromley, south London. The tram stop is one of the eastern termini of Tramlink.

For train journeys, Beckenham Junction is in Travelcard Zone 4. Most trains that call are operated by Southeastern, but some Southern services also call.

Facilities
The station has a car park with 88 spaces, and is usually staffed during operating hours. The station also has a small convenience store, coffee kiosk and toilets, which are only available during staffing hours.

Platforms 
Beckenham Junction has a total of 4 platforms (+ 2 for tramlink)

Platform 1

Platforms 2 & 3

Platform 2 is used for Southeastern services to  via  & . Platform 3 is for Southeastern services to  via .  Fast trains to and from London Victoria (Chatham side) also pass these platforms.

Platform 4

This platform is another terminating bay linked with the spur to the Mid-Kent Line, and is occasionally used during engineering or other disruption.

Tramlink Platforms

There are 2 Croydon Tramlink platforms outside the stations. They are both used for trams to and from Wimbledon via East Croydon, which terminate here.

Services

National Rail
National Rail services at Beckenham Junction are operated by Southeastern and Southern using ,  and  EMUs.

The typical off-peak service in trains per hour is:
 2 tph to  via 
 2 tph to  via 
 2 tph to 

During the peak hours, the station is served by an additional half-hourly service between London Victoria and Bromley South. During the evenings (after approximately 20:00), the service to London Bridge is reduced to hourly.

On Sundays, the Southern service to London Bridge does not run.

London Trams
Tram services at Beckenham Junction are operated by Tramlink. The tram stop is served by trams every 10 minutes to  via Croydon. This is reduced to a tram every 15 minutes on Saturday evenings and Sundays.

Services are operated using Bombardier CR4000 and Stadler Variobahn Trams.

Connections
London Buses route 162 serves the station.

History

National Rail

The station was opened by the Mid-Kent Railway (MKR) on 1 January 1857 as the terminus of the line from Lewisham; it became a junction on 3 May 1858 when the West End of London and Crystal Palace Railway Farnborough Extension line from Crystal Palace to Shortlands was opened. On 1 July 1863 the London Chatham & Dover Railway Metropolitan Extension from Beckenham to Victoria/Blackfriars completed the lines serving the station. In 1863 the MKR was taken over by the South Eastern Railway (SER) and thereafter the station was operated jointly by the LCDR and SER. Despite a partial rebuilding in 1890 the original MKR building is still in use as the main station offices and booking hall.

From December 2007, a significant upgrade to train services at Beckenham Junction took place, with an increase in frequency of the London Victoria to Orpington services (off peak) to every 15 mins. Until Section 2 of High Speed 1 opened in 2007 Eurostar services passed the station, but did not stop. In December 2010 Southern increased the number of evening services on Monday-Saturdays so that trains would run to London Bridge Station later into the evening.

Tramlink

The two platform Tramlink stop opened in 2000, with the rest of the route to the Croydon loop. The stop is outside the station, across the car park, beside the A2015 road, which avoids Beckenham town centre.

Accidents and incidents

References

External links

Beckenham Junction tram Stop – Timetables and live departures at Transport for London
Photo Gallery of Tramlink

Tramlink stops in the London Borough of Bromley
Railway stations in the London Borough of Bromley
Former South Eastern Railway (UK) stations 
Railway stations in Great Britain opened in 1857
Railway stations served by Govia Thameslink Railway
Railway stations served by Southeastern
Rail junctions in London
1857 establishments in England